Baseball has been an event at the African Games in Johannesburg, South Africa in 1999 and in Abuja, Nigeria in 2003.

Tournament results

Medal table

See also
Baseball awards#Africa
African Baseball & Softball Association

 
Sports at the African Games
Africa
All-Africa Games